Zhou Hong may refer to:

Zhou Hong (volleyball) (born 1966), Chinese volleyball player
Jessie Zhou (born 1987), Chinese actress